Titan was a professional esports organization founded in September 2013. Titan formerly sponsored teams in Counter-Strike: Global Offensive, Dota 2, Quake Live, and Smite. CEO and founder Damien Grust announced the organisation's dissolution on 13 January 2016, citing financial issues.

Dota 2 
Titan started its Dota 2 team in 2013 by recruiting four players from Orange Esports, Lee "KyXy" Kong Yang, Lim "Net" Wai Pern, Joel "Xtinct" Chan and Chong "Ohaiyo" Xin Khoo, in addition to Chua "Ice" Chee Cai.

Although the team secured a podium finish at Mineski Pro Gaming League, in December 2013 Ice was dismissed from the team, being replaced first by Singaporean carry player Gavin ‘Meracle’ Kang and then Malaysian player Ng Wei "NWP" Poong (formerly known as "Yamateh").

The team went on to win the Asian Cyber Games 2013 and finished 9th/10th place at The International 4 in 2014.

In October 2014, the Titan Dota 2 team was disbanded and the division was officially put on hold. Most of the players went on to join the newly formed Team Malaysia.

Counter-Strike: Global Offensive 
In January 2014, Titan formed a CS:GO team by recruiting the VeryGames team of Kévin "Ex6TenZ" Droolans, Nathan "NBK" Schmitt, Edouard "SmithZz" Dubourdeaux, Adil "ScreaM" Benrlitom, and Richard "shox" Papillon. The team went on to win the February 2014 DreamHack Invitational tournament, defeating their rivals Ninjas in Pyjamas. With Copenhagen Games 2014 the first LAN to do groups based on world rankings, Titan was ranked as the second best team in the world, but failed to deliver at the event.

The team's lineup changed in May 2014, with the departure of shox and the arrival of Kenny "kennyS" Schrub.  Following the change, the team did poorly, although they took second place at Gfinity 3 in August 2014.

In September 2014, the roster was restructured again. Only Ex6TenZ and kennyS were retained, and they were joined by three players from Team LDLC: Dan "apEX" Madesclaire, Mathieu "Maniac" Quiquerez and Hovik "KQLY" Tovmassian. The new lineup then went on to win the DreamHack Stockholm Invitational in Globen, taking down parts of their former teammates in LDLC. KennyS was also singled out as "the best Counter-Strike: Global Offensive player in the world" by CS:GO analyst Duncan "Thorin" Shields, with the team being ranked as no. 5 on his Top 10 World Ranking list leading up to DreamHack Winter 2014.

In November 2014, Hovik "KQLY" Tovmassian was dismissed from the team after receiving a VAC ban, with returning CS:S player Cédric "RpK" Guipouy taking his place. Also returning but in July 2015 would be previous Titan team members shox and SmithZz, replacing the two exiting players apEX and kennyS. In September 2015 Maniac, another longtime member, left the team, making room for yet another returning player, ScreaM.

However, on 13 January 2016, Titan's Founder and CEO Damien Grust issued a statement from its official website stating that they do not possess the revenue to keep supporting their CS:GO division and that they would disband.

"From then on it was a real uphill battle and I forced myself to reinvest into Titan in order to keep the company afloat for at least one more year, believing that we could make it after all. We fought the entire year, trying to secure sponsorships that would enable us to keep a struggling, but great CS:GO team as well as our SMITE team. We also sought advice from agencies and lawyers to maybe even sell shares in the company, or merge with another one. None of these scenarios ever materialised with any of the potential partners we spoke to.

Here we are now, starting 2016 without a budget high enough to keep a CS:GO team or pay our amazing staff. How profoundly sad."

Smite 
In December 2014 Titan expanded its esports presence by recruiting Aquila, securing the lineup of Nate “Ataraxia” Mark, Andreas “KanyeLife” Christmansson, Emil “PrettyPriMe” Edström, Thomas “Repikas” Skallebaek, and Kevin “Confrey” Confrey.

Founded as Agilitas at the start of the Smite Pro league qualifier in 2013, the team had stayed largely intact since its inception, adding manager Job “CaptCoach” Hilbers and analyst Erik “Omgimabird” Sjösten as support staff.

Playing their way through the Smite Challenger Cup and placing 1st seven weeks in a row, the team ended 2014 by winning the Smite European Regionals after a 2-0 clean sweep against SK Gaming in the finals. In the following 2015 Smite World Championship tournament the team managed to beat Oh My God and SK Gaming, with Titan taking an impressive second place after losing 2–3 to the home soil lineup of Cognitive Prime in the grand final.

In August 2015 Job “CaptCoach” Hilbers left the team in search for new challenges, and the following month saw the team part ways with Kevin “Confrey” Confrey, being replaced by the up-and-coming talent of Nicklas "Brotuz" Petersen.

On 12 January 2016, Titan's Smite division dissolved due to the departure of the current Titan SMITE roster. It would only be a mere day later that Titan's CSGO division followed suite and was shut down, along with the rest of Titan.

"The departure from Titan also signals the end of the current roster, with parts of the Thomas "Repikas" Skallebaek, Nicklas "Brotuz" Petersen, Nate "Ataraxia" Mark, Emil "PrettyPriMe" Edström and Andreas "KanyeLife" Christmansson lineup going their separate ways."

Former players

Counter-Strike: Global Offensive
 Nathan "NBK" Schmitt
 Kenny "kennyS" Schrub
 Adil "ScreaM" Benrlitom
 Dan "apEX" Madesclaire
 Mathieu "Maniac" Quiquerez
 Hovik "KQLY" Tovmassian
 Kévin "Ex6TenZ" Droolans 
 Richard "shox" Papillon 
 Cédric "RpK" Guipouy
 Edouard "SmithZz" Dubourdeaux
 Victor "LiCroM" Albe
 Jérôme "NiaK" Sudries (Manager)

Smite
 Kevin "Confrey" Confrey (Hunter)
 Thomas "Repikas" Skallebaek (Jungler/Guardian)
 Nicklas "Brotuz" Petersen (Solo)
 Nate "Ataraxia" Mark (Hunter)
 Emil "PrettyPriMe" Edström (Mid)
 Andreas "KanyeLife" Christmansson (Guardian)
Job "CaptCoach" Hilbers (Coach)
 Erik "Omgimabird" Sjösten (Analyst)

Dota 2 
 Chua "Ice" Chee Cai
 Galvin Kang Jian "Meracle" Wen
 Chong Xin "Ohaiyo" Khoo
 Wei Poong "NWP" Ng
 Wai Pern "Net" Lim
 Joel Zhan Leong "XtiNcT" Chan
 Kong Yang "kY.xY" Lee

Quake Live 
 Alexey "cYpheR" Yanushevsky
 Andrew "Vamper" Sirnikov
 Sergey "evil" Orekhov

Achievements

Counter-Strike: Global Offensive

Smite

Dota 2

Quake Live

References

External links 
 

Esports teams based in Singapore
Esports teams established in 2013
Esports teams disestablished in 2016
Defunct and inactive Counter-Strike teams
Defunct and inactive Dota teams
Smite (video game) teams
2016 disestablishments in Singapore
Titan (esports) players